Woodside Methodist Episcopal Church, also known as Woodside United Methodist Church, is a historic Methodist church located on Main Street, and North Murderkill Hundred in Woodside, Kent County, Delaware. It was built in 1889, and is a rectangular frame building in the Late Gothic Revival style.  It measures 50 feet, 4 inches, deep by 30 feet, 6 inches wide.  It has a steeply pitched gable roof and features a bell tower capped with a steepled, square belfry.

It was added to the National Register of Historic Places in 1996.

References

Methodist churches in Delaware
Churches on the National Register of Historic Places in Delaware
Gothic Revival church buildings in Delaware
Churches completed in 1889
19th-century Methodist church buildings in the United States
Churches in Kent County, Delaware
National Register of Historic Places in Kent County, Delaware